Mr. Calder and Mr. Behrens is a 1982 short story collection by the British crime and spy writer Michael Gilbert featuring his eponymous counter-intelligence agents. It was published by Hodder & Stoughton in the UK and by Harper & Row in the US. The book was Gilbert's second collection of Calder and Behrens stories, following Game Without Rules (1967).

Stories 
The book contains the following stories, all originally published in Ellery Queen's Mystery Magazine:
 "The Twilight of the Gods"
 "Emergency Exit"
 "One-to-Ten"
 "The Peaceful People"
 "The Lion and the Virgin"
 "The African Tree Beavers"
 "Signal Tresham"
 "The Mercenaries"
 "Early Warning"
 "The Killing of Michael Finnegan"
 "The Decline and Fall of Mr. Behrens"
 "The Last Reunion"

Literary criticism 

Kirkus Reviews called the stories "a tidy assortment" for those who enjoy leisurely, literate espionage vignettes, even though few are plausible and the humour "sometimes dry to the point of invisibility".

Adaptations 

A series of twenty radio plays by Gilbert under the general title Game without Rules was broadcast by BBC Radio 2 between October 1968 and January 1969, including the following derived from stories collected in this anthology:
 "In Which Mr Calder Acquires a Dog" (adapted from "Emergency Exit")
 "The Peaceful People"
 "One-to-Ten"
 "The African Tree Beavers"
 "The Lion and the Virgin"
 "Ahmed and Ego" (adapted from "The Decline and Fall of Mr. Behrens")
 "The Mercenaries"
 "Signal Tresham"

References 

1982 short story collections
British short story collections
British spy fiction
Fictional secret agents and spies
Hodder & Stoughton books
Harper & Row books
Mystery short story collections
Thriller short story collections
Short story collections by Michael Gilbert